Bathyliotina armata, is a species of sea snail, a marine gastropod mollusk in the family Liotiidae.

Description
The size of the shell varies from 7 mm to 12 mm.

Distribution
This marine species occurs off the Philippines, the Korea Strait and Japan.

References

 Higo, S., Callomon, P. & Goto, Y. (1999). Catalogue and bibliography of the marine shell-bearing Mollusca of Japan. Osaka. : Elle Scientific Publications. 749 pp.

External links
 

armata
Gastropods described in 1861